Tyler Long (born April 6, 1993) is an American professional football punter who is a free agent. He played college football for the University of Alabama at Birmingham and holds records for career field goals as well as the longest field goal in school history. He also has played for the Washington Redskins during the 2015 National Football League (NFL) preseason.
Long was a high school classmate of musical artist Russ at Roswell High School.

Professional career

Washington Redskins 
On May 7, 2015, Long signed with the Washington Redskins to compete with placekicker Kai Forbath. He played in three preseason games for the team. On August 30, 2015, he was waived.

Pittsburgh Steelers 
On January 20, 2016, Long signed a reserve/future contract with the Pittsburgh Steelers. On May 5, 2016, he was waived by the team.

BC Lions
Long was signed by the BC Lions on May 24, 2017. He became the starting punter and placekicker, following the release of veteran kicker Swayze Waters. Long converted 39 of 44 field goals (88.6%) in his first season with the Lions. He also averaged 47.9 yards on 116 punts. At the conclusion of the 2018 season Long was named the Lions' nominee for Most Outstanding Player and Most Outstanding Special Teams Player. He was also named a CFL All-Star for the second consecutive season. On January 4, 2019, he was released by the Lions in order to pursue an NFL opportunity (Long's contract would have expired February 12, 2019).

Los Angeles Chargers
On January 14, 2019, Long signed a reserve/future contract with the Los Angeles Chargers. He was named the Chargers starting punter to start the season. In Week 1, following an injury to kicker Michael Badgley, Long took over kicking duties along with punting. He converted his only field goal attempt and converted all three extra points, while punting twice for 98 yards inside the 20-yard-line. After his NFL debut performance against the Indianapolis Colts, Long was named the Week 1 AFC Special Teams Player of the Week. In Week 4, against the Miami Dolphins, Long converted three extra point attempts and three field goal attempts in the 30–10 victory. Long signed a one-year exclusive-rights free agent tender with the Chargers on March 17, 2021.

New York Jets
On September 14, 2022, Long was signed to the New York Jets' practice squad. He was released on September 20.

References

External links
 Los Angeles Chargers bio
 BC Lions bio

1993 births
Living people
UAB Blazers football players
People from Roswell, Georgia
Players of American football from Georgia (U.S. state)
Sportspeople from Fulton County, Georgia
BC Lions players
American players of Canadian football
American football placekickers
Canadian football placekickers
Canadian football punters
Washington Redskins players
Pittsburgh Steelers players
Los Angeles Chargers players
New York Jets players
American football punters